Rabia Naseem Farooqi is a Pakistani politician who had been a member of the Provincial Assembly of the Punjab from August 2018 till January 2023.

Political career
She was elected to the Provincial Assembly of the Punjab as a candidate of Pakistan Muslim League (N) (PML-N) on a reserved seat for women in 2018 Pakistani general election. In the 2015 local government polls, Rabia was the first ever female who won the Union Council Chairperson elections. She contested from UC-217 in Lahore and enjoyed a historic victory. Out of the 550-odd candidates put up for the chairperson slot by the three main parties, only three candidates were women and out of these only Rabia was elected. In phase II of the local body elections, Rabia was once again the only female candidate who was shortlisted for the prestigious position of Mayor of Lahore.

References

Living people
Pakistan Muslim League (N) MPAs (Punjab)
Punjabi people
Year of birth missing (living people)